Yifa Yulüdi, born Han (汗), was the brother and successor of Qiufu Youdi. He ruled from 57 to 59 AD and was succeeded by his nephew, Xitong Shizhu Houdi.

Footnotes

References

Bichurin N.Ya., "Collection of information on peoples in Central Asia in ancient times", vol. 1, Sankt Petersburg, 1851, reprint Moscow-Leningrad, 1950

Taskin B.S., "Materials on Sünnu history", Science, Moscow, 1968, p. 31 (In Russian)

Chanyus